Max Octavius Grosskreutz (27 April 1906 in Proserpine, Queensland – 20 September 1994) was an Australian speedway rider.

Speedway career
Grosskreutz finished third in the Star Riders' Championship in 1935, the forerunner to the Speedway World Championship which began a year later in 1936.

He won the Australian Championship at Davies Park Speedway in Brisbane in 1929 and again in 1936 at the famous Sydney Showground. He was also NSW State Champion in 1936 and 1946.

He moved to the Belle Vue Aces in 1931. He stayed with the aces until the end of the 1936 season when he retired to manage the Norwich Stars. During this time he made forty-one Test Match appearances for Australia.

In 1947 he made a comeback, riding for the Odsal Boomerangs and made three further Test Match appearances.

Players cigarette cards
Grosskreutz is listed as number 17 of 50 in the 1930s Player's cigarette card collection.

References 

1906 births
1990 deaths
Australian speedway riders
People from Queensland
Belle Vue Aces riders
Norwich Stars riders